The Gatuncillo Formation (Tgo) is a geologic formation in central Panama. The formation is exposed in the Panama Canal Zone and surrounding areas. It preserves fossils dating back to the Middle to Late Eocene period.

Description 
The Gatuncillo Formation is the oldest sedimentary unit of the Panama Canal Zone, unconformably resting on Cretaceous basement. The formation was defined as Gatuncillo Shale by Thompson in 1944, who named it after the Gatuncillo River.

Though the Gatuncillo consists chiefly of mudstone and siltstone, it includes bentonitic mudstone, sandstone, and limestone, and at the base a conglomerate of variable thickness.

Fossil content 
 Zamia nelliae
 Podocnemididae indet.

See also 
 List of fossiliferous stratigraphic units in Panama

References

Bibliography 
 
 
 
 

Geologic formations of Panama
Paleogene Panama
Mudstone formations
Sandstone formations
Siltstone formations
Limestone formations
Conglomerate formations
Reef deposits
Shallow marine deposits
Paleontology in Panama
Formations
Formations